German submarine U-984 was a Type VIIC U-boat built for Nazi Germany's Kriegsmarine for service during World War II.
She was laid down on 7 September 1942 by Blohm & Voss, Hamburg as yard number 184, launched on 12 May 1943 and commissioned on 17 June 1943 under Oberleutnant zur See Heinz Sieder.

Design
German Type VIIC submarines were preceded by the shorter Type VIIB submarines. U-984 had a displacement of  when at the surface and  while submerged. She had two shafts and two  propellers.

U-984 was fitted with five  torpedo tubes (four fitted at the bow and one at the stern), fourteen torpedoes, one  SK C/35 naval gun, 220 rounds, and one twin  C/30 anti-aircraft gun. The boat had a complement of between forty-four and sixty.

Service history
The boat's career began with training at 5th U-boat Flotilla on 17 June 1943, followed by active service on 1 August 1944 as part of the 9th Flotilla for the remainder of her service.

On 22 January 1944, Maschinenobergefreiter Hermann Keller was lost overboard in the North Atlantic.

On 8 June 1944, U-984 was bombed by an unidentified Allied aircraft and was sufficiently damaged to force a return to base on 9 June

Wolfpacks
U-984 took part in four wolfpacks, namely:
 Rügen (14 – 26 January 1944)
 Stürmer (26 January – 3 February 1944)
 Igel 1 (3 – 17 February 1944)
 Dragoner (22 – 27 May 1944)

Fate
Sunk on or about 2 August 1944 in the English Channel south-west of Brighton in position  by unknown cause. All hands were lost.

Previously recorded fate
All hands were lost.
U-984 has subsequentially been positively identified as the U-boat sunk on or about 2 August 1944 in the English Channel south-west of Brighton, in position 50.03.732N, 00.32.398W, by unknown cause, but there is presently no plausible explanation for its loss in the wreck position.

Summary of raiding history

See also
 Convoys HX 229/SC 122
 James D. Prentice

References

Notes

Citations

Bibliography

External links

German Type VIIC submarines
1943 ships
U-boats commissioned in 1943
Ships lost with all hands
U-boats sunk in 1944
U-boats sunk by depth charges
U-boats sunk by Canadian warships
World War II shipwrecks in the Atlantic Ocean
World War II submarines of Germany
Ships built in Hamburg
Maritime incidents in August 1944